Rosemead High School is a secondary school located at 9063 East Mission Drive in Rosemead, California. It is a secondary school in the El Monte Union High School District. The campus, which is adjacent to a city park and pool, has 80 classrooms and a full-time certificated staff of 82 who provide support for approximately 1900 students.

Rosemead High School requires 220 credits for graduation, including 40 credits in English and 20 in science, mathematics and physical education, respectively. The school offers Chinese and Spanish as foreign languages. The school also offers a number of advanced placement courses.

Academics
Rosemead High School provides a wide range of support programs to meet the academic needs of its students. The following programs are made available: English Language Arts support classes, which include; English Intensive for ninth-grade students, ALD 2 & ALD 3 English, for tenth and 11th-grade students, all of which are two-hour blocks; AVID; a math intervention lab was introduced during the 2017–2018 school year. An after-school PREP program is also available for use by students, providing tutoring in all core subject areas. Instructional services are provided to all Limited English Proficient (LEP) students by the California Education Code and Title V of the California Administrative Code. Special Education students have their needs met through Individualized Educational Programs (IEPs).

AP Courses 
For the 2019–2020 school year, Rosemead High School offers 19 Advanced Placement classes: AP Government and Politics United States, AP United States History, AP World History, AP English Language and Composition, AP English Literature and Composition, AP Seminar, AP Calculus AB, AP Calculus BC, AP Statistics, AP Biology, AP Chemistry, AP Environmental Science, AP Physics 1, AP Chinese Language and Culture, AP Spanish Language and Culture, AP Spanish Literature and Culture, AP 2D Art and Design, and AP Macroeconomics.

Career Technical Education programs 
Some Rosemead High School students participate in certain Career and Technical Education courses including:
• Arts Media and Entertainment with a career pathway to Graphic Arts
• Hospitality, Tourism, and Recreation with a career pathway to Food Services and Hospitality
• Finance and Banking with a career pathway to Financial Services Business Accounting
• Engineering and Design with a career pathway to Engineering Design (Project Lead the Way)

Extracurriculars 
Rosemead High School offers a wide variety of clubs and sports run by students and administered by the principal of student affairs and corresponding advisors/coaches. The school's Associated Student Body (ASB) also provides assistance in these areas, helping school administration manage the individual sports and clubs. Rosemead High School's main rival is Arroyo High School.

Sports 
The following sports are currently active at Rosemead High School: boys and girls basketball, baseball, cheer, color guard, boys and girls cross-country, football, boys and girls soccer, tennis, track and field, soccer, softball, swimming, volleyball, and wrestling.

Clubs 
The vast number of clubs at Rosemead High School include BAGATHS, SAGATHS, Ecology, Helping Hands, Key Club, Link Crew, Red Cross, Pantherama, Drama, Instrumental Music, K-Pop Dance, Spirit Leaders, Vocal Club, Anime, Best of Thymes Garden, Gaming, Penopsis, Programming, Science Olympiad, Speech and Debate, PAWS Nami, SAVE, SPEAK, California Scholarship Federation (CSF), Engineering Club, GATE, and National Honor Society (NHS).

School facilities
Built to house approximately 1,800 students, it has been in continuous operation ever since. Seventy-nine classrooms provide space for the school's comprehensive college preparatory and vocational curriculum, including ten science labs, two industrial technology classrooms, one family/consumer science state of the art culinary facility, two art classrooms, four performing arts (instrumental and vocal music, piano and drama) classrooms, three business computer labs, two Internet-connected computer labs, a full-sized gymnasium, dance room, and weight room, a library and an up-to-date cafeteria.

With the passage of Measure Y in 2003 and Measure D in 2008, the school and district began an extensive construction program to upgrade facilities. Rosemead has received new bleachers for its football stadium, upgrades, and renovation of all student and adult restrooms on campus, improved paving, grading, and drainage throughout the campus—including the renovation of Panther Square, and a complete rewiring of the bell, fire, and public address systems. Additional upgrades were a new two-story classroom building, and the doubling in size of the current library/media center was also added.

During the 2009-2010 school years, Rosemead High School underwent a bond-funded renovation and modernization. With the help of the bond a new two-story building composed of eighteen new classrooms, new parking lot, new track, new air-conditioning system in the auditorium, and the construction of a new weight room have all been completed. All landscaping and hardscape on campus are also new. The library, culinary arts kitchen, graphic arts classroom, all science labs, and administration building were all modernized.

Achievements
 2015 California Gold Ribbon School 
 2016 Best High School by US Newsweek 
 2017-18 State Honor Roll for High Performance

Safety
In keeping with district policy, Rosemead High School believes that the safety of students, employees, and guests is of the highest priority. Regular reviews of and improvements to the Safe School Plan ensure a safe and orderly environment and support the school's strong commitment to safety. Fire Drills are conducted once a month and earthquake/evacuation drills are held once each semester to ensure that all students and staff know the procedures to follow in the event an emergency or disaster should occur. 
The school has a strong connection to and relationship with the Temple City Sheriff's Station and the deputies on the Rosemead Team. A School resource officer (SRO) is on campus during school hours to assist with law enforcement issues and is a welcome presence at co-curricular activities, athletic events and dances. The SRO also interacts with school staff and students in a wide range of situations. The officer is accessible to students, parents, and staff during the school day.
The school has taken further steps to increase safety by locking gates and instituting a sign-in system at the switchboard where non-students/staff check-in and out during school hours. These safety measures have made the campus less accessible to outsiders. The school employs five part-time campus supervisors who are directed by the Assistant Principal for Activities and the Assistant Principal for Student Services to provide a school climate that is safe, supportive and orderly. These staff members patrol the hallways and grounds during class time and are highly visible at times when large groups of students are out on campus.

Notable alumni
 Bob Mackie, fashion designer
 Vikki Carr, singer
 Jaime Luis Gomez (1993), also known as Taboo, one of the members of The Black Eyed Peas
 Prima J, Mexican American musical group
 Molly Bee, singer and actress
 Rod Marinelli, former NFL head coach
 Audie Desbrow, drummer for the band Great White
 Rene Gonzales, major league baseball player, Baltimore Orioles
 Humberto Leon, American fashion designer, founder of Opening Ceremony and creative director of the French fashion brand Kenzo

External links

References

High schools in Los Angeles County, California
Educational institutions established in 1949
Public high schools in California
1949 establishments in California